Samuel Hannaford (10 April 1835 – 7 January 1911) was an American architect based in Cincinnati, Ohio. Some of the best known landmarks in the city, such as Music Hall and City Hall, were of his design. The bulk of Hannaford's work was done locally, over 300 buildings, but his residential designs appear through New England to the Midwest and the South.

Biography
Born in England, Hannaford immigrated with his family to Cincinnati at age nine.

Hannaford attended public schools and graduated from Farmer's College, Cincinnati, where he studied architecture. Hannaford opened an office in 1857 and in 1887 formed the firm of Samuel Hannaford & Sons. At the time of his death, he was director of the Ohio Mechanics' Institute. Hannaford died in his home in Cincinnati on 7 January 1911.

List of works
This list includes works by Samuel Hannaford and, after 1904, works by his firm Samuel Hannaford and Sons.

Cincinnati
 Northside Methodist Church (1893)
 Our Lady of Mercy High School (1897)
 Balch House
 Cuvier Press Club Building (1862–63)
 Samuel Hannaford House (1865)
 Cincinnati Workhouse (1869, demolished 1990)
 St. George's Church (1872)
 Cincinnati Observatory (1873)
 Music Hall (1878)
 Nast Trinity United Methodist Church (1880)
 Cincinnatian Hotel (1882)
 Salem United Methodist Church (1882)
 Elsinore Arch (1883)
 Hoffner Masonic Lodge (1886)
 Winton Place Methodist Episcopal Church (1885, and parsonage in 1888)
 Lombardy Apartment Building (1885)
 Ohio National Guard Armory (1886, demolished)
 Eden Park Station No. 7 (1889)
 Cincinnati Odd Fellows Temple (1891?)
 Phoenix Building/Cincinnati Club (1893)
 Cincinnati City Hall (1893)
 Ransley Apartment Building (1895)
 Hooper Building (1896)
 Eden Park Stand Pipe (1894)
 Price Hill Masonic Lodge#524 (1877)
 Van Wormer Library at the University of Cincinnati (1901)
 Hyde Park School at the corner of Edwards and Observatory Roads (1903)
 Carnegie Library (1905 - 1906) at 3738 Eastern Avenue in Cincinnati
 Emery Theatre (1912)
 H.&S. Pogue Company Department Store (1916)
 Cincinnati Times-Star Building (1933)
 Westwood Methodist Church Sunday School Building   D. Meinken & Sons General Contractor
 multiple houses in the Winton Place, Cincinnati residential district
 John E. Bell Residence 306 McMillan Street. Cincinnati, O; 1881–1882- Destroyed.
 Mary A. Wolfe House
 George B. Cox House, one-time home to renowned Cincinnati political boss George Barnsdale Cox, and later the longtime home to the Pi Kappa Alpha fraternity at the University of Cincinnati. Parkview Manor became the Clifton Branch of the Cincinnati Public Library system in 2015.
 The Mutual Building, Covington, KY

Miscellaneous
Colonel Joseph Taylor House (1878)
Vigo County Courthouse (1888)
Sorg Opera House Middletown, OH (1891)
 Terre Haute Union Station (1893)
 Greene County Courthouse  (1902)
Washington County Courthouse (1902)
Monroe County Courthouse (1905)

Samuel Hannaford and Sons Thematic Resources
A 1978 study titled the "Samuel Hannaford and Sons Thematic Resources in Hamilton County" was conducted which identified numerous Hannaford buildings for potential listing in the U.S. National Register of Historic Places.  This led to numerous actual listings of Hamilton County properties designed by the Hannafords.

Gallery

References

External links
 The Legacy of Samuel Hannaford, an extensive guide to Hannaford's career

1835 births
1911 deaths
Burials at Spring Grove Cemetery
Architects from Cincinnati
 
British emigrants to the United States
19th-century American architects
20th-century American architects